Stoczek may refer to:

Stoczek Łukowski in Lublin Voivodeship (east Poland)
Stoczek, Białystok County in Podlaskie Voivodeship (north-east Poland)
Stoczek, Grajewo County in Podlaskie Voivodeship (north-east Poland)
Stoczek, Hajnówka County in Podlaskie Voivodeship (north-east Poland)
Stoczek, Mońki County in Podlaskie Voivodeship (north-east Poland)
Stoczek, Lublin County in Lublin Voivodeship (east Poland)
Stoczek, Radzyń Podlaski County in Lublin Voivodeship (east Poland)
Stoczek, Garwolin County in Masovian Voivodeship (east-central Poland)
Stoczek, Węgrów County in Masovian Voivodeship (east-central Poland)
 in the Warmian-Masurian Voivodeship (north-east Poland)